The 2014 FIBA Europe Under-16 Championship was the 28th edition of the European Under-16 Basketball Championship. 16 teams participated in the competition, held in the four Latvian cities of Ogre, Grobiņa, Liepāja and Riga, from 20 to 30 August 2014. Spain were the defending champions.

Participating teams
  (Runners-up, 2013 FIBA Europe Under-16 Championship Division B)

  (Winners, 2013 FIBA Europe Under-16 Championship Division B)
  (3rd place, 2013 FIBA Europe Under-16 Championship Division B)

First round
The first-round groups draw took place on 1 December 2013 in Freising, Germany. In this round, sixteen teams are allocated in four groups of four teams each. The top three teams of each group will advance to the Second Round. The last teams will play in the Classification Group G first, then in the 9th – 16th place playoffs.

Group A

|}

Group B

|}

Group C

|}

Group D

|}

Second round
Twelve advancing teams from the First Round will be allocated in two groups of six teams each. The top four teams of each group will advance to the quarterfinals. The last two teams of each group will play in the 9th – 16th place playoffs against the teams from the Group G.

Group E

|}

Group F

|}

Classification Group G
The last team of each group of the First Round will compete in this Classification Round.

|}

9th – 16th place playoffs

13th – 16th place playoffs

9th – 12th place playoffs

Championship playoffs

Quarterfinals

5th – 8th place playoffs

Semifinals

Final classification games

Match for 15th place

Match for 13th place

Match for 11th place

Match for 9th place
{{Basketballbox
|bg=#eeeeee
|date=30 August 2014
|time=20:15
|place=Riga Olympic Centre II, Riga
|teamA=
|teamB=
|scoreA=68
|scoreB=77
|Q1=10–11
|Q2=18–23
|Q3=19–16
|Q4=21–27|report=Report
|points1=Arnoldas Kulboka 21
|rebounds1=Rokas Gadiliauskas 7
|assist1=Eimantas Stankevicius 9
|points2=Michail Lountzis 13
|rebounds2=Georgios Tarlas 9
|assist2=Michail Lountzis 9
|attendance=20
|referee=Carmelo Paternico (ITA), Luis Lopes (POR), Alexey Chudin (RUS)
}}

Match for 7th place

Match for 5th place

Bronze medal match

Final

Final standings

All-Tournament Team

 Kristers Zoriks
 Bathiste Tchouaffe 
 Rodions Kurucs 
 Ömer Yurtseven 
 Killian Tillie (MVP''')

References

External links
FIBA Archive

FIBA U16 European Championship
2014–15 in European basketball
2014–15 in Latvian basketball
International basketball competitions hosted by Latvia
Sports competitions in Riga
Sport in Liepāja